Milena Balsamo (born 26 January 1961 Bologna) is an Italian Paralympic athlete.

She competed in a wheelchair as a sprinter in category 4, and participated in the 1984 Stoke Mandeville Paralympics, and 1988 Summer Paralympics, in Seoul, winning a total of five medals, including four in the relay. 

In 2015, she was awarded the Collare d'oro for sporting merit  by the Italian National Olympic Committee.

Life 
She was born in Bologna. She was trained in the San Michele Society. 

She won a bronze medal at the 1984 Summer Paralympics, in the 4x400 meters, and silver medal at the 100 meters. She won a gold medal at the 1988 Summer Paralympic Games in the 4x100 meters, and bronze medal at the 4x200 meters, and 4x400 meters. 

In 1992, she retired from international competition.

References 

1961 births
Living people
Sportspeople from Bologna
Paralympic athletes of Italy
Italian wheelchair racers
Paralympic gold medalists for Italy
Paralympic silver medalists for Italy
Paralympic bronze medalists for Italy
Athletes (track and field) at the 1984 Summer Paralympics
Athletes (track and field) at the 1988 Summer Paralympics
Medalists at the 1984 Summer Paralympics
Medalists at the 1988 Summer Paralympics